Kampong Menunggol is a village in Brunei-Muara District, Brunei, on the island . The population was 541 in 2016. It is one of the villages within Mukim Kota Batu, a mukim in the district.

Facilities

School 
 Nakhoda Abdul Rashid Primary School — a government primary school

Mosque 
Kampong Menunggol Mosque is the village mosque; it was inaugurated on 14 November 1980 and can accommodate 300 worshippers.

References 

Menunggol